Ministry of Planning is a ministry in India. The minister responsible is the Hon'ble Prime Minister of India. The ministry's institutional capacity is exercised through the central agency:  NITI Aayog  (National Institution for Transforming India).

NITI Aayog 
On 1 January 2015, a Cabinet resolution was passed to replace the Planning Commission with the newly formed NITI Aayog (National Institution for Transforming India). Union Government of India announced the formation of NITI Aayog on 1 January 2015. The first meeting of NITI Aayog was chaired by Narendra Modi on 8 February 2015.

NITI Aayog's mandate is to support the center and the states in transforming India by promoting  cooperative federalism by fostering the involvement of State Governments of India in the economic policy-making process using a bottom-up approach. The Governing Council of NITI, with The Prime Minister as its Chairman, comprises Chief Ministers of all States and Lt. Governors of Union Territories (UTs). In addition, temporary members are selected from leading universities and research institutions. These members include a chief executive officer, four ex-officio members, and two part-time members. The agency's Vice Chairman holds a Cabinet Minister equivalent rank.

NITI Aayog primarily provides policy inputs to the highest decision making bodies. Through its monitoring and evaluation division, it monitors all national and state schemes to provide annual review to the Prime Minister and India Budget. It also provides its comments on all major schemes before being approved by the Finance Ministry.

The body is known for pioneering recruitment of Ivy League specialists from across the world through its Work For India initiative. The body's lateral entry is the largest in the country among government bodies with lateral hires account more than half of the core work force. The body's highly successful Young Professional program is being emulated by all central ministries and army.

Ministers of Planning

References

Government ministries of India